Álvaro Zazo Feito (born 18 August 1982) is a Spanish retired professional footballer who played as a midfielder.

Club career
Born in Madrid, Zazo finished his youth career with local Las Rozas CF, making his senior debut in the 2002–03 season with CD Toledo, in the Segunda División B. A year later he joined RCD Mallorca, being exclusively associated to the reserves in his two-year spell and being relegated from the third division in his final one.

In the summer of 2005, Zazo signed with CF Fuenlabrada also in the Community of Madrid, scoring twelve goals in his first and only season. He then moved to neighbouring Rayo Vallecano also in the third tier, where he began suffering heavily from injury problems, which caused him to miss the entirety of the 2007–08 and 2009–10 campaigns; during his spell with the club, he also played with Lorca Deportiva CF on loan.

In July 2010, Zazo signed with CD Leganés. He left after one sole season, and joined CD Tenerife still in division three.

On 9 July 2012, Zazo signed with Segunda División side CD Guadalajara. He made his debut as a professional on 19 August, playing the full 90 minutes in a 1–1 away draw against AD Alcorcón. However, in September, he suffered another knee injury which kept him out of action for six months.

Zazo appeared in only six matches as the Castile-La Mancha team were relegated, and renewed his contract on 15 August 2013. On 15 March 2015, after nearly eight months without a club, he signed for Real Avilés.

On 11 January 2017, after almost two years of inactivity, Zazo joined third-tier UD San Sebastián de los Reyes. He retired at the end of 2019 aged 37, following medical advice.

References

External links

1982 births
Living people
Spanish footballers
Footballers from Madrid
Association football midfielders
Segunda División players
Segunda División B players
CD Toledo players
RCD Mallorca B players
CF Fuenlabrada footballers
Rayo Vallecano players
Lorca Deportiva CF footballers
CD Leganés players
CD Tenerife players
CD Guadalajara (Spain) footballers
Real Avilés CF footballers
UD San Sebastián de los Reyes players